The bilander, also spelled billander or bélandre is a two-masted vessel, the foremast carrying square rigs on all of its yards and its taller mainmast having a long lateen mainsail yard with corresponding trapezoidal sail and rig inclined at about 45° with square rigs on the yards above that, the lowermost secured at the corners by a crossjack.

History
A  bilander was a small European merchant ship with two masts - used in the Netherlands for coast and canal traffic and occasionally seen in the North Sea but more frequently to be seen in the Mediterranean Sea. In England, the use of the bilander can be dated back as far as the reign of Queen Elizabeth. The mainmast was lateen-rigged with a trapezoidal mainsail, but the foremast carried the conventional square course and square topsail. Displacement was typically under 100 tons. However, the design was eventually replaced by more efficient sailing ship designs, leading it to be regarded as simply a precursor to the brig. The design was popular in the Mediterranean Sea as well as around New England in the first half of the 18th century but was soon surpassed by better designs. It is considered the forerunner of the brig. Few examples survive.

References 

Merchant sailing ship types
Sailing rigs and rigging
Tall ships